Dündarlı is a belde (town) in the central district  (Niğde) of Niğde Province, Turkey. At   it is situated in a basin along Kocaçay creek. The population of Dündarlı is 3625 as of 2011. The settlement was founded in the 16th century by a clan from Eymür tribe of Turkmens.In 1963 the settlement was declared a seat of township. The town economy depends on apple production. Animal breeding and carpet are secondary activities.

References

Populated places in Niğde Province
Towns in Turkey
Niğde Central District